Xfinity Flex (formerly Xfinity Instant TV) is  an American over-the-top internet television service owned by Comcast. The service – which is structured as a virtual multichannel video programming distributor – is only available to Comcast Xfinity internet customers. It is designed as an alternative to other competing OTT skinny bundles for cord cutters, offering a selection of major cable channels and on-demand content that can be streamed through smart TVs, digital media players, and mobile apps.

Supported devices

Supported Xfinity Stream TV devices include:

TV-connected
 Amazon Fire TV
 Roku
 Apple TV
 Samsung Smart TV
 Chromecast

Mobile
 Android mobile devices
 Apple iOS mobile devices

Computer
 macOS
 Windows

See also
 Xfinity
 DirecTV Stream
 FuboTV
 HBO Now
 LocalBTV
 Locast
 Now
 Sling TV
 YouTube TV

References

External links
 

Internet television streaming services
Comcast subsidiaries
Internet properties established in 2017
2017 software
American companies established in 2017